The 1987 NCAA Division I Outdoor Track and Field Championships were contested June 3−6, 1987, at the Bernie Moore Track Stadium at Louisiana State University in Baton Rouge, Louisiana in order to determine the individual and team national champions of men's and women's collegiate Division I outdoor track and field events in the United States. 

These were the 65th annual men's championships and the sixth annual women's championships. This was the Tigers and Lady Tigers' third time hosting the event (although first as a combined men's and women's event) and the first since 1987.

UCLA and LSU topped the men's and women's team standings, respectively; it was the Bruins' seventh men's team title and the first for the Lady Tigers. LSU's title would ultimately be the first of a record eleven consecutive national championships stretching from 1987 to 1997.

Team results 
 Note: Top 10 only
 (H) = Hosts
 Full results

Men's standings

Women's standings

Individual results

References

NCAA Men's Outdoor Track and Field Championship
NCAA Division I Outdoor Track and Field Championships
NCAA
NCAA Division I Outdoor Track and Field Championships
NCAA Women's Outdoor Track and Field Championship